"You're the One" is a song recorded by American female R&B vocal trio SWV for their second studio album, New Beginning (1996). RCA Records released the song on March 29, 1996, as the lead single from New Beginning. It is considered one of the group's signature songs, topping the US Billboard Hot R&B Singles chart and becoming a top-10 hit in New Zealand. A sample of this song can be heard in South Korean boy group EXO's song "Ya Ya Ya" from their seventh studio album, Obsession (2019).

Critical reception
Larry Flick from Billboard wrote, "New-jill-swingin' trio returns with a preview into its forthcoming "New Beginning" collection that is strong enough to fend off the dreaded sophomore slump. Playfully straddling the track's bouncy jeep/funk groove, "sisters" Cheryl Gamble, Tamara Johnson and Leanne Lyons harmonize with ample diva prowess. Best of all, the songs has a hook to please the most discerning pop listener. Dine on it over and over."

Chart performance
"You're the One" spent one week at number one on the US Billboard Hot R&B/Hip-Hop Songs chart, making it their third single to reach number one on that chart. Due to its high initial sales, along with sufficient airplay, it became a crossover success, debuting at number nine on the Billboard Hot 100 and peaking at number five, becoming their fourth and final top-10 hit. The single sold 900,000 copies domestically and was certified Gold by the Recording Industry Association of America (RIAA). Worldwide, "You're the One" peaked at number 99 in Australia, number 53 in Canada, number 13 in the United Kingdom, and number six in New Zealand, where it earned a Gold certification for sales of over 5,000 copies.

Music video
An accompanying music video was made for the song. It was shot from December 4–5, 1995.

Track listings
All versions of "'96 Anthem – You're the One" feature Lost Boyz, Trigger tha Gambler, and Smooth da Hustler. All versions of the D.J. Clark Kent remix feature Jay-Z. All versions of the Puff Daddy Bad Boy remix feature Busta Rhymes.

 US CD, 12-inch, and cassette single
 Australian and Japanese CD single
 "You're the One" (LP version) – 4:39
 "You're the One" (instrumental) – 4:44
 "You're the One" (a cappella) – 4:40

 US and Canadian maxi-CD single (Remixes)
 "'96 Anthem – You're the One" (Allstar remix with rap) – 4:58
 "You're the One" (D.J. Clark Kent remix with rap) – 4:39
 "You're the One" (Puff Daddy Bad Boy remix with rap) – 4:38
 "You're the One" (KO remix) – 4:33
 "You're the One" (LP version) – 4:39

 US 12-inch single (Remixes)
A1. "'96 Anthem – You're the One" (Allstar remix with rap) – 4:58
A2. "You're the One" (D.J. Clark Kent remix with rap) – 4:39
A3. "You're the One" (LP version) – 4:39
B1. "You're the One" (Puff Daddy Bad Boy remix with rap) – 4:38
B2. "You're the One" (KO remix) – 4:33
B3. "You're the One" (Soul 360 remix) – 4:17

 US cassette single (Remixes)
A1. "'96 Anthem – You're the One" (Allstar remix with rap) – 4:58
A2. "You're the One" (D.J. Clark Kent remix with rap) – 4:39
B1. "You're the One" (Puff Daddy Bad Boy remix with rap) – 4:38

 UK CD single
 "You're the One" (radio edit) – 3:49
 "'96 Anthem – You're the One" (Allstar remix with rap) – 4:22
 "You're the One" (D.J. Clark Kent remix with rap) – 5:38
 "Right Here – Human Nature Duet" (Demolition 12-inch mix) – 4:58

 UK 12-inch single
A1. "'96 Anthem – You're the One" (Allstar remix with rap) – 4:22
A2. "'96 Anthem – You're the One" (Allstar remix instrumental) – 4:22
A3. "You're the One" (radio edit) – 3:49
B1. "You're the One" (D.J. Clark Kent remix with rap) – 5:38
B2. "You're the One" (SWV dub mix) – 5:29
B3. "You're the One" (Soul 360 guitar remix) – 4:17

 European CD single
 "You're the One" (LP version) – 4:39
 "You're the One" (instrumental) – 4:44

Charts

Weekly charts

Year-end charts

Certifications

Release history

See also
 R&B number-one hits of 1996 (USA)

References

1996 singles
1996 songs
Bertelsmann Music Group singles
RCA Records singles
Songs written by Andrea Martin (musician)
SWV songs